Kingsway Business Park is a tram stop on the Oldham and Rochdale Line (ORL) of Greater Manchester's Metrolink network. It is located in Firgrove, on the northeastern side of Kingsway Business Park in the Metropolitan Borough of Rochdale, between the Milnrow and Newbold stations. It opened as part of Phase 3a of the system's expansion, on 28 February 2013.

History

Following the rejection of the Greater Manchester Transport Innovation Fund the station had an unknown future being unfunded by the rest of the 3A and 3B program with suggestions private contributions would be required for construction to proceed.

In March 2011 it was proposed to cancel the plans for Drake Street Metrolink station for being too close to Rochdale Station Metrolink stop and generate efficiency savings while it was also noted a significant gap in coverage existed around Kingsway which could lead to the construction of Kingsway Business Park after all. On 8 July 2011 the Transport for Greater Manchester Committee gave approval of the station after Rochdale Council pledged £2.5m towards the stop.

Services

Kingsway Business Park is located on the Oldham & Rochdale Line with trams towards Manchester city centre and Rochdale Town Centre.

Services are mostly every 12 minutes on all routes.

Connecting bus routes

From nearby Rochdale Road, First service 408 runs north to Rochdale and south to Oldham via Milnrow, Shaw and Royton. Burnley Bus Company service R5 runs between Rochdale and Peppermint Bridge via Milnrow and Newhey.

References

External links

Metrolink stop information
Kingsway Business Park area map

Tram stops in the Metropolitan Borough of Rochdale
Railway stations in Great Britain opened in 2013
Tram stops on the East Didsbury to Rochdale line